Charles Emmett Case (September 7, 1879 – April 16, 1964), was a Major League Baseball pitcher during four seasons from 1901 to 1906. On August 31, 1909, Case, pitching for the Southern Association's Nashville Vols, pitched a no-hitter against the New Orleans Pelicans at Pelican Park in New Orleans.

References

External links

1879 births
1964 deaths
Major League Baseball pitchers
Baseball players from Ohio
Cincinnati Reds players
Pittsburgh Pirates players
Indianapolis Hoosiers (minor league) players
Rock Island Islanders players
Springfield Hustlers players
Rochester Bronchos players
Kansas City Blues (baseball) players
Springfield Senators players
Nashville Vols players
Montgomery Rebels players